Latin Dafonso Berry (born January 13, 1967) is a former professional American football player who played three seasons as defensive back for the Los Angeles Rams and Cleveland Browns.

References

1967 births
Living people
American football safeties
Cleveland Browns players
Los Angeles Rams players
Oregon Ducks football players
Players of American football from Los Angeles